Corentin Denolly (born 6 June 1997 in Vienne, Isère) is a French tennis player.

On the junior tour, Denolly has a career high combined ranking of 3 achieved on 8 June 2015. He reached the semifinals of the 2015 French Open boys' singles event, losing to Taylor Harry Fritz.

Denolly has a career high ATP singles ranking of 289 achieved on 25 November 2019.

Challenger and Futures/World Tennis Tour finals

Singles: 24 (8-16)

Doubles: 12 (8–4)

References

External links
 
 

1997 births
Living people
French male tennis players
Sportspeople from Vienne, Isère
Competitors at the 2018 Mediterranean Games
Mediterranean Games gold medalists for France
Mediterranean Games medalists in tennis